The Township of North Huron is a municipality in Huron County, Ontario, Canada. It was formed in 2001 when the Ontario government imposed amalgamation on municipalities throughout the province. Specifically, the former township of East Wawanosh was merged with the village of Blyth and the town of Wingham.

Communities 
North Huron includes the following communities:

 Belgrave
 Blyth
 Whitechurch (borders on Huron-Kinloss, Bruce County)
 Wingham
 Donnybrook (borders on Ashfield–Colborne–Wawanosh)
 Fordyce (borders on Ashfield–Colborne–Wawanosh)
 Marnock
 Westfield

History
Indigenous people's presence in North Huron has been recorded long before European settlers arrived in the 1830s. The largest part of the township - East Wawanosh - is named after Chippewa Chief Wawanosh who signed an 1825 land use treaty. Arrowheads and other indigenous artifacts have been found by East Wawanosh farmers since European settlement.

Wawanosh was originally the largest township in Huron County, with 85,640 acres. According to an early land assessment, there were 133 residents in 1844 and 87 acres of land cultivated. In 1850, an acre of land cost 8 shillings. Within 20 years, the population grew to 3,151 residents, with 12,000 acres cleared.

In 1866, Wawanosh was divided into two separate townships - East Wawanosh and West Wawanosh, which is now part of Ashfield-Colborne-Wawanosh township.

By 1869, Belgrave was a village with a population of 50 in the Township of Morris County, Huron. It was established on the Maitland River. It was a stop on the Buffalo and Lake Huron Railway. There were stages to Wingham, Teeswater, Riversdale and Kincardine. The average price of land was $20.

More than 20 schools have existed in North Huron. From the 1850s to 1960s, more than a dozen rural school houses educated the children of East Wawanosh. In 1967, East Wawanosh Public School was opened and taught hundreds of children from Kindergarten to Grade 8. The school closed in 2012, with remaining students sent to Wingham.

Demographics 

Notable people 
Former residents include:
Alice Munro - writer
 Jo Manning - artist
 George Agnew Reid - painter

See also
List of townships in Ontario

References

External links 

Township municipalities in Ontario
Lower-tier municipalities in Ontario
Municipalities in Huron County, Ontario